Il Mondo Nuovo (The New World) is the third studio album by the Italian band Il Teatro degli Orrori, released in 2012.

The album was a finalist for the Premio Tenco 2012 in the category "Album of the Year".

Album
The album title pays homage to the work Brave New World by Aldous Huxley. The record looks like a concept album about immigration and initially had the title Stories of an immigrant (in reference to Storia di un impiegato by Fabrizio De André).

The album cover is called Face Cancel, by Roberto Coda Zabetta.

The song Ion is dedicated to Ion Cazacu, Romanian worker killed by fire in 2000 in Varese, the entrepreneur, head of the company where he worked Ion, killed him after it had rebelled against the inhumane working conditions to which he was subjected, along his companions. Pierpaolo Capovilla asked the widow Nicoleta Cazacu permission to post the song.

The song Doris is a revised version (not completely a cover) of the homonymous song by Shellac from the EP Uranus, both musically and textually.

Track list
"Rivendico"
"Io cerco te"
"Non vedo l'ora"
"Skopje"
"Gli Stati Uniti d'Africa"
"Cleveland – Baghdad"
"Martino"
"Cuore d'oceano" feat Caparezza
"Ion"
"Monica"
"Pablo"
"Nicolaj"
"Dimmi addio"
"Doris"
"Adrian"
"Vivere e morire a Treviso"

Lineup
 Pierpaolo Capovilla – voice
 Gionata Mirai – guitar
 Giulio Favero – bass
 Francesco Valente – drums

References

2012 albums
Il Teatro degli Orrori albums